Shahab Dehghanian (born 30 November 2001) is an Iranian professional footballer who plays as a defensive midfielder for Persian Gulf Pro League club Persepolis.

Club career

Persepolis
On september 19,2020 joined to Persepolis Club Academy.

In 2022, with the opinion of head coach Yahya Golmohammadi, Dehghanian was added to the training sessions of the Persepolis adult team

Career statistics

References

External links 
varzesh3

2001 births
Living people
Iranian footballers
Association football midfielders
Persepolis F.C. players